is a Prefectural Natural Park in Akita Prefecture, Japan.

See also

 National Parks of Japan
 Parks and gardens in Akita Prefecture

References

Parks and gardens in Akita Prefecture
Protected areas established in 1964
1964 establishments in Japan
Fujisato, Akita
Noshiro, Akita